Silver Tree is a television and film writer, producer and director, from Petaluma, California

Early life
Silver Tree was born to Susan (née Fullam) and Scott Tree on March 12, 1977 in Sonoma County California and raised in Petaluma.

She attended El Molino High School in Forestville, California and Nonesuch School (High School) in Sebastopol, California. Silver Tree attended Santa Rosa Junior College, and Sonoma State University where she majored in biochemistry.

Career
Tree was an airline flight attendant based in San Francisco when she was involuntarily furloughed for six months. During the furlough, she began co-writing, with Abraham Levy, the screenplay for The Aviary, a film about four flight attendants who live together in an apartment. Tree and Levy self-financed and distributed the $25,000 film.

Personal life
Silver Tree, a Suits director and producer, was one of the guests at Meghan Markles wedding to Prince Harry at St George's Chapel, Windsor Castle on May 19, 2018.

Filmography

Films

Television

References

External links

Living people
Flight attendants
Film producers from California
American television directors
People from Petaluma, California
American women television directors
1977 births